Pinoy Pop Superstar is a Philippine television singing talent show broadcast by GMA Network. Hosted by Regine Velasquez, it premiered on July 3, 2004. The show concluded on June 2, 2007 with a total of 3 seasons.

Seasons

Contestants
Season 1
 Michael Garcia
 Kristel Astor
 Charmaine Piamonte
 MC Monterola
 Brenan Espartinez
 Jonalyn Viray
 Philbert de Torres from Canada
 Sheila Ferrari from the United States

Season 2
 Harry Santos
 Gerald Santos
 Aicelle Santos
 Denver Regencia
 Irra Cenina
 Ronnie Liang
 Daryl Ong
 Elise Estrada from Canada
 Rosemarie Tan from the United States

Season 3
 Joyce Tanaña
 Miguel Naranjilla
 Maricris Garcia
 Jennie Escalada
 Marvin Gagarin
 Bryan Termulo
 John Louie Abaigar
 April delos Santos
 Jae Buensuceso from the United States

Accolades

See also
 Pinoy Pop Superstar: The Finalists

References

External links
 

2004 Philippine television series debuts
2007 Philippine television series endings
Filipino-language television shows
GMA Network original programming
Philippine reality television series